Matsuchi (written: 待乳 or 真土) may refer to:

 (1850–1938), Japanese photographer
, train station in Matsuno, Kitauwa District, Ehime Prefecture, Japan

Japanese masculine given names